Palata is a comune (municipality) in the Province of Campobasso in the Italian region Molise, located about  northeast of Campobasso.

Palata borders the following municipalities: Acquaviva Collecroce, Guardialfiera, Guglionesi, Larino, Montecilfone, Montenero di Bisaccia, Tavenna.

Twin towns
 Raszków, Poland, since 2012

See also
 Molise Croats
 Duke of Palata

References

Cities and towns in Molise